The Unholy Quest is a 1934 British horror film directed by Widgey R. Newman and starring Claude Bailey, Terence de Marney and Christine Adrian. It was made as a quota quickie.

A mad professor tries to revive the body of a long-dead crusader.

Cast
 Claude Bailey as Professor Sorotoff
 Terence de Marney as Frank Davis
 Christine Adrian as Vera
 John A. Milton as Hawkins 
 Harry Terry as Soapy
 Ian Wilson as Wilky

References

Bibliography
 Chibnall, Steve. Quota Quickies: The Birth of the British 'B' Film. British Film Institute, 2007.
 Low, Rachael. Filmmaking in 1930s Britain. George Allen & Unwin, 1985.
 Wood, Linda. British Films, 1927-1939. British Film Institute, 1986.

External links

1934 films
British horror films
1934 horror films
Films directed by Widgey R. Newman
Quota quickies
British black-and-white films
1930s English-language films
1930s British films